In mathematics, a field K with an absolute value is called spherically complete if the intersection of every decreasing sequence of balls (in the sense of the metric induced by the absolute value) is nonempty:

The definition can be adapted also to a field K with a valuation v taking values in an arbitrary ordered abelian group: (K,v) is spherically complete if every collection of balls that is totally ordered by inclusion has a nonempty intersection.

Spherically complete fields are important in nonarchimedean functional analysis, since many results analogous to theorems of classical functional analysis require the base field to be spherically complete.

Examples
Any locally compact field is spherically complete. This includes, in particular, the fields Qp of p-adic numbers, and any of their finite extensions.
Every spherically complete field is complete. On the other hand, Cp, the completion of the algebraic closure of Qp, is not spherically complete.
Any field of Hahn series is spherically complete.

References

Algebra
Functional analysis